Felicissimus and Agapitus were two of the six deacons of Pope Sixtus II who were martyred with him on or about 6 August 258, Felicissimus and Agapitus on the same day as the Pope. The seventh deacon, Lawrence of Rome, was martyred on 10 August of the same year.

Felicissimus and Agapitus are venerated particularly at the Catacombs of Praetextatus on the Via Appia, where they were buried.

The Tridentine Calendar commemorated Sixtus, Felicissimus, and Agapitus on the feast of the Transfiguration of the Lord, 6 August. They remained in that position in the General Roman Calendar until 1969, when, with the abolition of commemorations, the memorial of Pope Sixtus "and his companions" was moved to 7 August, the day immediately after that of their death.

Notes

258 deaths
3rd-century Christian martyrs
Groups of Christian martyrs of the Roman era
Year of birth unknown